Nicaragua competed at the 1992 Summer Olympics in Barcelona, Spain. Eight competitors, seven men and one woman, took part in nine events in six sports.

Competitors
The following is the list of number of competitors in the Games.

Athletics

Men's Marathon
 William Aguirre — 2:34.18 (→ 73rd place)

Boxing

Men's Featherweight (– 57 kg)
 Eddy Sáenz
 First Round — Lost to Victoriano Damian (DOM), 14:23

Men's Welterweight (– 67 kg)
 Mario Romero
 First Round — Defeated Khyber Shah (PAK), 7:2 
 Second Round — Lost to Andreas Otto (GER), RSCH-2

Cycling

One female cyclist represented Nicaragua in 1992.

Women's Individual Road Race
Olga Sacasa

Women's 1.000m Sprint
Olga Sacasa

Women's 3.000m Individual Pursuit
Olga Sacasa
Final — 16th place overall; did not qualify semi-finals - top 8 places went to semi-finals.

Shooting

Men's Air Pistol (10 metres)
Norman Ortega

Weightlifting

Men's Flyweight
Alvaro Marenco

Men's Bantamweight
Orlando Vásquez

Wrestling

Men's Freestyle Heavyweight
Magdiel Gutiérrez

See also
Nicaragua at the 1991 Pan American Games

References

External links
Official Olympic Reports

Nations at the 1992 Summer Olympics
Olympics
1992